Channel ME (former MRTV Entertainment) is a free-to-air channel broadcasting 24 hours with the sole purpose of entertaining the public. Broadcast from Naypyidaw by state-run Myanmar Radio and Television (MRTV).

Programming 
Quest to Million (since 2017)
The Mask Singer Myanmar (since 2019)

See also 
 MRTV (Broadcast Network)
 MRTV (TV channel)
 MITV
 MRTV-4
 Television in Myanmar
 Media in Myanmar

References

External links 
 Official Facebook page of Channel ME (Burmese)

Mass media in Myanmar
Television channels in Myanmar
Television in Myanmar